Syndemis xanthopterana is a species of moth of the family Tortricidae. It is found in Azerbaijan.

References

	

Moths described in 1980
Archipini